Himalayan University, Itanagar, Arunachal Pradesh, India, is a non-profit university recognized by University Grant Commission, Government of India under section of 2f of UGC act 1956. The university was established to develop and uplift the economy through higher education to raise the literacy rate that make up especially  North Eastern part of India as well as all other parts of India. The University is accredited and recognized by All India Council for Technical Education (AICTE), Pharmacy Council of India (P.C.I), Bar Council of India (B.C.I), Rehabilitation Council of India (R.C.I) and is also a member of AIU, AIMA, CII.

Accreditation

Enrollment

Gallery

Academics 

Himalayan University offers Under Graduate Degree Programme & Post Graduate Degree Programme  in all major disciplines including undergraduate and postgraduate education. Himalayan University has the following academic departments:

Faculty of Arts and Social Science  - Specialization in History / Pol. Sc / Sociology / Education / English / Geography / Economics 
Faculty of Engineering & Technology - Specialization in Civil Engineering B.E., B.Tech., B.Arc., ME., M.Tech., M.Arc.
Faculty of Business Management and Administrative Studies MBA., HR and all.other speciality
Faculty of Computer Science and Information Technology.BCA., MCA.
Faculty of Pharmacy - Specialization in Diploma in Pharmacy and Bachelor in Pharmacy C.Pharm., D.Pharm., B.Pharm., M.Pharm.
 Faculty of Medical Science & Technology B.N.Y.S., MD.
Faculty of Library Sciences
Faculty of Special Education - Specialization in Mental Retardation & Learning Disability
Faculty of Journalism and Mass Communication
Faculty of Law & Judicial Research 
Faculty of Fine Arts and Creative Education
Faculty of Commerce
Faculty of Science - Specialization in Botany / Agriculture / Zoology
Faculty of Nursing & Pharmacy & Paramedical Science - Himalayan University introduces faculty of nursing and paramedical sciences where students of Arunachal Pradesh and Assam can take admission to start with most rewarding career stream.

Awards 

BW Education Award 2020 has been announced Himalayan University as one of the Emerging Higher Education Institutions in India where Dr. Anil Sahasrabudhe, Chairman - AICTE; Chair the BW Education Award 2020 Jury Members.
Himalayan University has been awarded as Excellent Progressive University (North East) by Dr. Manpreet Singh Manna from AICTE in 12th World Education Summit 2018 Elets Awards held on 9 & 10 August 2018 at New Delhi.   
Dialogue India conducted its 4th Academic Conclave in IIT Delhi on 19th-May-2018 in association with IIT Delhi’s Design Department where Himalayan University, Itanagar has been awarded with Best Private University of North East in imparting quality higher education. The VC of Himalayan University Prof. S P Singh had received the award from Chief Guest Smt. Krishna Raj, Hon’ble Union State Minister, Govt of India along with Prof. V Ramgopal Rao, Director IIT Delhi and Dr. Anil D. Sahasrabudhe, Chairman AICTE.
Himalayan University ranked 7th in top 10 emerging Universities in India and ranked 10th in top 10 high quality infrastructure Universities in India.
Himalayan University won another magnificent to add to its unmatched caliber and international renown. Named as the "Outstanding Support for Career Researchers 2017 Award".
Himalayan University of Itanagar (Arunachal Pradesh) won prestigious award of being University of the Year in East India during the grand ceremony of the 'National Education Excellence Award 2017', held on 21 January 2017 in Goa.
Progressing fast with admirable pace, Himalayan University now won the award of being the "University of the Year –East" on 26 May 2016, granted by FRANCHISE INDIA.
Himalayan University received the prestigious award of being a "Progressive Higher Education Institution Operating in the Private Space", during the grand ceremony of the 'World Education Award 2016' held in Dubai from 7 to 8 February 2016, organized by Elets Technomedia.
Himalayan University was awarded as "Leading University of the Year (North East India)" under Brands Achiever Awards 2015; held on 10oct 2015, for pursued excellence in consumer satisfaction and signifies the appreciation of its target audience in respect of Quality Higher Education. Indian Cricket Legend "Ajay Jadeja" grace the occasion as Chief Guest.
Himalayan University (Itanagar, Arunachal Pradesh) received the highly prestigious "National Education Excellence Award 2015" of ASSOCHAM on 18 April 2015, for being the Best University in Rural Area.
Himalayan University has been awarded as "Best university of the year (East)" in excellence in education under 4th Annual India Education Award 2014 by Franchise India.
Himalayan University is winner of "Best Start Up University" by Digital Learning under World Education Summit 2014.
Himalayan University has been awarded as Best University for "Innovation in Rural Education" by Indian Education Innovation Awards 2014.
Himalayan University has been awarded with "e-Campus Award For Higher Education" under South Asia Education Summit Awards 2014.

References

2012 establishments in Arunachal Pradesh
Educational institutions established in 2012
Universities in Arunachal Pradesh